Jan Harmensz. Muller (1571–1628) was a Dutch engraver and painter.

Muller was born in Amsterdam. His father was a book printer, engraver and publisher. He learned the engraving trade while working at the family business. He traveled and lived in Italy for a time. Muller returned home, inherited his father's business, and died in 1628.

Works
 Rape of Sabine, The Art Institute of Chicago, Chicago
 Couple embracing, The J. Paul Getty Museum, Los Angeles
 Two studies of Atlas, The Fitzwilliam Museum, Cambridge, UK
 Masked Ball, Le Louvre, Paris
 Head, Le Louvre, Paris
 Agar in the desert, Le Louvre, Paris
 The Prodigal son being seduced, Le Louvre, Paris
 Raising of Lazarus', National Gallery of Ottawa, Canada

References

Engravers from Amsterdam
Dutch Golden Age painters
Dutch male painters
1571 births
1628 deaths
Painters from Amsterdam